Adolphus Roffe (November 6, 1890 – December 31, 1968) was an American equestrian. He competed in two events at the 1928 Summer Olympics.

References

1890 births
1968 deaths
American male equestrians
Olympic equestrians of the United States
Equestrians at the 1928 Summer Olympics
Sportspeople from Independence, Missouri